She's in the Army is a 1942 American comedy film directed by Jean Yarbrough and written by Sidney Sheldon and George Bricker. The film stars Lucile Gleason, Veda Ann Borg, Marie Wilson, Robert Lowery, Lyle Talbot and Warren Hymer. The film was released on May 15, 1942, by Monogram Pictures.

Plot
A socialite joins the Womens Ambulance Corps as both a publicity stunt and to win a bet with a newspaper columnist, who wagered $5000 that she couldn't last six weeks.

Cast          
Lucile Gleason as Sgt. Hannah Walters
Veda Ann Borg as Diane Jordan
Marie Wilson as Susan Slatterty
Robert Lowery as Lt. Jim Russell
Lyle Talbot as Capt. Steve Russell
Warren Hymer as Cpl. Buck Shane
Eddie Acuff as Pete
John Holland as Wally Lundigan 
Gene O'Donnell as Speed 
Charlotte Henry as Helen Burke
Marvelle Andre as Instructor
Lorraine Miller as Nightclub Singer
Pat Moran as Janitor
Martha Warner as Commander Davis

References

External links
 

1942 films
1940s English-language films
American comedy films
1942 comedy films
Monogram Pictures films
Films directed by Jean Yarbrough
World War II films made in wartime
American black-and-white films